Mahala Ashley Dickerson (October 12, 1912 – February 19, 2007) was an American lawyer and civil rights advocate for women and minorities. In 1948 she became the first African American female attorney admitted to the Alabama State Bar; in 1951 she was the second African American woman admitted to the Indiana bar; and in 1959 she was Alaska's first African American attorney. In 1983 Dickerson was the first African American to be elected president of the National Association of Women Lawyers. Her long legal career also helped to pave the way for other women attorneys. In 1995 the American Bar Association named her a Margaret Brent Women Lawyers of Achievement honoree.

Early life and education
Mahala Ashley was born in rural Montgomery County, Alabama, on October 12, 1912, to Hattie (Moss) and John Augustine Ashley. Her father was the owner of a general store. Her siblings included two sisters, Erna and Harriette. Ashley grew up in Alabama. She attended Montgomery Industrial School for Girls (Miss White's School), a private school in Montgomery, where she met Rosa Parks, her lifelong friend who would become an activist in the civil rights movement. In 1935, Ashley graduated cum laude with a degree in sociology from Fisk University in Nashville, Tennessee.

Following her divorce from her first husband, Henry Dickerson, in 1939, Mahala Ashley enrolled at the Howard University School of Law in Washington, D.C. She graduated cum laude and was one of four women to graduate in her class of 1948.

Marriage and family
Mahala Ashley married Henry Dickerson in 1938, but they divorced the following year. The Dickersons were the parents of triplet sons: Alfred, John and Henri Christophe "Chris" (who became a well-known professional bodybuilder).

In 1951 Mahala Dickerson married Frank R. Beckwith, an Indianapolis attorney, and relocated with her three sons to Indianapolis, Indiana. In 1958, after her marriage to Beckwith ended in divorce, Dickerson moved to Alaska. The couple had no children together. In 1960 Beckwith became the first African American to run as a candidate for President of the United States in a major-party primary when he ran in Indiana's Republican presidential primary.
He also ran in Indiana's Republican presidential primary in 1964.

Career

Legal career
After graduating from law school, Dickerson returned to Alabama to practice law. In 1948 she became the first African-American woman to be admitted to the Alabama State Bar. Dickerson established offices in Montgomery and Tuskegee, Alabama, where she practiced law for the next three years.

In 1951, following her marriage to Frank Beckwith, Dickerson moved to Indianapolis, Indiana, and became the second black woman to be admitted to the Indiana bar. Dickerson and Beckwith practiced together for a year before she opened her own law office in Indianapolis.She was especially interested labor and civil rights issues. In 1953, for example, Dickerson petitioned the Public Service Commission to request that the commissioners deny approval of a local transportation company's requests for fare increases until the company agreed to discontinue what she argued were its discriminatory practices against bus drivers and trolley operators.

In 1958, after working as an attorney in Alabama and Indiana, she took a vacation to Alaska and decided to move there with her sons. Dickerson established a law practice an Anchorage in 1959. One of her most notable cases was an equal pay lawsuit filed on behalf of a female professor at the University of Alaska. It was one of the first cases representing women professors at an American university whose salaries were lower than their male counterparts. Dickerson initially lost the case, but the court's decision was reversed on appeal in 1975.

Civic and philanthropic activities
During her years in Indianapolis she was active in Alpha Kappa Alpha sorority, the National Bar Association, the Lawyers Guild of American, Americans for Democratic Actions, American Society of Friends, the YWCA and NAACP. She also served as chairman of the board of directors of the Marion County [Indiana] Colored Women's Republican Club.

Later years
Dickerson remained active in her later years. In addition to serving as president of Dickerson and Gibbons, the law firm she established in Alaska, she founded Al-Acres, a charitable non-profit organization. In 1983 she was elected the first black president of the National Association of Women Lawyers. In 1984 the University of Alaska awarded her an honorary Doctor of Laws degree. The American Bar Association also recognized Dickerson for her civil rights advocacy and legal career by naming her a Margaret Brent Women Lawyers of Achievement honoree in 1995. Dickerson published her memoir, Delayed Justice for Sale, in 1998.

Throughout her long legal career Dickerson was considered an advocate for the poor and underprivileged. As she told the Anchorage Daily News, "In my life, I didn't have but two things to do. Those were to stay black and to die. I'm just not afraid to fight somebody big.... Whenever there's somebody being mistreated, if they want me, I'll help them." Dickerson continued to practice law in Alaska until she was in her early  nineties, only a few years before her death in 2007.

Death and legacy
Dickerson died in Wasilla, Alaska, on February 19, 2007, at the age of ninety-four. Dickerson is buried in a cemetery she established on her Alaska property.

Dickerson became the first black female attorney admitted to the bar in Alabama (in 1948); the second black woman admitted to the bar in Indiana (in 1951); and Alaska's first black attorney (in 1959). She was also the first black elected as president of the National Association of Women Lawyers (in 1983). With more than fifty-years of legal experience, she also helped to pave the way for other women attorneys. According to her American Bar Association profile, Dickerson prosecuted "one of the first equal pay cases on behalf of women university professors who received less pay than their male counterparts." In 1995, the American Bar Association named Dickerson a Margaret Brent Women Lawyers of Achievement honoree, an honor also given to U.S. Supreme Court Justices Ruth Bader Ginsburg (a 1983 honoree)  and Sandra Day O'Connor (an honoree in 2000), among other notable women lawyers, judges, law professors, and government leaders. Dickerson's papers are housed at the David M. Rubenstein Rare Book and Manuscript Library at Duke University in Durham, North Carolina.

Honors and tributes
The University of Alaska awarded her an honorary Doctor of Laws degree in 1994. 
The American Bar Association named her a Margaret Brent Women Lawyers of Achievement honoree in 1995.

Selected published works
 Delayed Justice for Sale (1998), a memoir
 "Jet-Propelled into the Law: Mahala Ashley Dickerson" (1998), profile in Rebels in Law: Voices in History of Black Women Lawyers (1998)

See also
List of first women lawyers and judges in Alaska

References

Sources

External links
 M. Ashley Dickerson's Law Office Web Page

1912 births
2007 deaths
Activists from Alaska
African-American people in Alaska politics
African-American women lawyers
African-American lawyers
Alabama lawyers
Alaska lawyers
Lawyers from Montgomery, Alabama
Lawyers from Anchorage, Alaska
People from Wasilla, Alaska
Indiana lawyers
Howard University School of Law alumni
20th-century American women lawyers
20th-century American lawyers
20th-century African-American women
20th-century African-American people
21st-century African-American people
21st-century African-American women